Éxtasis is a 1996 Spanish drama film directed by Mariano Barroso. It was entered into the 46th Berlin International Film Festival.

Cast
 Javier Bardem as Rober
 Federico Luppi as Daniel
 Sílvia Munt as Lola
 Daniel Guzmán as Max
 Leire Berrocal as Ona
 Alfonso Lussón as Uncle of Rober
 Guillermo Rodríguez as Quino
 Carlos Lucas as Hombre
 Juan Díaz as Hermano de Ona
 Elia Muñoz as Empleada
 Macarena Pombo as Ayudante
 Pep Cortés as Padre de Ona
 Paco Catalá as Dueño pensión

References

External links

1996 films
Spanish drama films
1990s Spanish-language films
1996 drama films
Films directed by Mariano Barroso
Films shot in Almería
1990s Spanish films